So Fresh: The Hits of Winter 2008 is a compilation of songs which were popular on the ARIA Charts of Australia in Winter 2008. It was released on 21 June 2008. It features a DVD containing the latest music videos.

Track listing

CD 
Newton Faulkner – "Dream Catch Me" (3:58)
Rihanna – "Take a Bow" (3:49)
Mariah Carey – "Touch My Body" (3:29)
Leona Lewis – "Better in Time" (3:53)
Kelly Rowland – "Work" (Freemasons Radio Edit) (3:11)
Jordin Sparks and Chris Brown – "No Air" (4:25)
Vanessa Amorosi – "Perfect" (4:48)
Brian McFadden – "Like Only a Woman Can" (3:51)
Britney Spears – "Break the Ice" (3:16)
OneRepublic – "Stop and Stare" (3:44)
Timbaland featuring Keri Hilson and Nicole Scherzinger – "Scream" (3:46)
Sara Bareilles – "Love Song" (4:19)
Duffy – "Mercy" (3:40)
Pete Murray – "You Pick Me Up" (4:32)
Rogue Traders – "What You're On" (3:35)
Ashlee Simpson – "Outta My Head (Ay Ya Ya)" (3:38)
Delta Goodrem – "You Will Only Break My Heart" (3:03)
Pnau – "Baby" (2:46)
Soulja Boy – "Yahhh!" (3:10)
Psycho Teddy – "Psycho Teddy" (3:07)

DVD
Newton Faulkner – "Dream Catch Me" (3:53)
Rihanna – "Take a Bow" (3:47)
Mariah Carey – "Touch My Body" (4:18)
Jordin Sparks and Chris Brown – "No Air" (4:48)
Vanessa Amorosi – "Perfect" (3:12)
Leona Lewis – "Better in Time" (3:57)
Sara Bareilles – "Love Song" (4:23)
Kelly Rowland – "Work" (Freemasons Radio Edit) (3:11)
Pnau – "Baby" (2:46)
Britney Spears – "Break the Ice" (3:20)
Brian McFadden – "Like Only a Woman Can" (3:57)
OneRepublic – "Stop and Stare" (4:04)
Delta Goodrem – "You Will Only Break My Heart" (3:04)
Ashlee Simpson – "Outta My Head (Ay Ya Ya)" (3:47)

Certifications

References

So Fresh albums
2008 compilation albums
2008 in Australian music
2008 video albums
Music video compilation albums